Kalkan may refer to:

 Kalkan, town on the Turkish Mediterranean coast
 Kalkan, Eğil
 Kalkan, Iran (disambiguation), places in Iran
 Hüseyin Kalkan, mayor of Batman in Southeast Anatolia, Turkey
 Murat Kalkan, Turkish footballer
 Nezihe Kalkan, Turkish dancer and singer
 Kalkan (fish), one of the vernacular name of the Black-Sea Turbot, Scophthalmus maeoticus
 Kal Kan, a brand of pet food now known as Whiskas

Turkish-language surnames